Route 82, also known as the Mondawmin Shuttle Bug or Mondawmin Shuttle, is one of two neighborhood shuttle routes operated by the Maryland Transit Administration in Baltimore. It was the second and is so far the final in the series of shuttle bus routes to be introduced by MTA in the 2000s. The route serves Baltimore City Community College, Coppin State College, and various nearby streets, some served by regular bus routes, and some not. But the full route is within a close walk of one or more other MTA bus routes. The route operates at 25-minute intervals.

Unlike most MTA bus routes, the Mondawmin shuttle, having the "shuttle" status, operates via a circuitous route, and allows boarding for $1.00 as opposed to the regular $1.60 fare.

History
Route 82 began service under Route 97 in 2002.

In 2005, as part of the Greater Baltimore Bus Initiative, it was initially proposed that the shuttle's frequency would be reduced to one bus an hour, and riders were encouraged to use other regular bus routes that shared common routing. However, after community meetings, it was ultimately decided that the schedule would remain the same.

In 2006, MTA proposed that the route would be modified to serve Reservoir Hill in order to replace a portion of Route 5 that was at the time proposed for modification away from this area. But it was later decided that Route 5 would continue to serve Reservoir Hill.

June 2011
Revise route to operate via Elgin Avenue on the southern loop with existing frequency.

References

Maryland Transit Administration bus routes
2002 establishments in Maryland